The 2017–18 FA Women's Premier League Cup is the 27th running of the competition, which began in 1991. It is the major League Cup competition run by the FA Women's Premier League, and for the fourth season it is being run alongside their secondary League Cup competition, the Premier League Plate.

All 71 Premier League clubs entered at the Determining round, with the winners continuing in the competition and the losers going into the Premier League Plate tournament.

Tottenham Hotspur is the reigning champions, having defeated Charlton Athletic 4–3 on penalties the previous season, but will not be defending their title after their promotion to the FA WSL 2.

Results
All results listed are published by The Football Association. Games are listed by round in chronological order, and then in alphabetical order of the home team where matches were played simultaneously.

The division each team play in is indicated in brackets after their name: (S)=Southern Division; (N)=Northern Division; (SW1)=South West Division One; (SE1)=South East Division One; (M1)=Midlands Division One; (N1)=Northern Division One.

Qualifying rounds

Determining round
The competition begins with a Determining Round, which consisted of 70 teams in the FA Women's Premier League being drawn in pairs, with Plymouth Argyle being given a bye. The winners of these 35 games and Plymouth Argyle progress to the next stage of the competition, while the losers qualify for the 2017–18 FA Women's Premier League Plate.

Preliminary round
With 36 teams progressing from the determining round, four needs to be eliminated to allow a single-elimination knockout tournament to take place. Twenty eight of the winners from the determining round were given byes to the first round, with eight teams being drawn against each other in preliminary round ties.

Competition proper

First round

Second round
The eight second round matches were originally scheduled to be played on Sunday 10 December 2017 before they were all postponed due to severe weather throughout the country.

Quarter-finals

Semi-finals

Final

References

FA Women's National League Cup
Prem